Renée Baillargeon (born 1954) is an Alumni Distinguished Professor of Psychology at the University of Illinois Urbana-Champaign. Baillargeon specializes in the development of cognition in infancy.

Life & career
Born in Quebec, Canada, Baillargeon is the third child of French-Canadian parents.   She is best known for her research showing that infants have an intuitive awareness of physical laws such as solidity, containment, and occlusion at a young age. However, her research interests encompass a variety of issues in causal reasoning, focusing not only on the physical but also the psychological, sociomoral, and biological domains.  Baillargeon received a B.A. in Psychology from McGill University in 1975 and a Ph.D. in Psychology from the University of Pennsylvania in 1981 under the supervision of Rochel Gelman and Elizabeth Spelke. Subsequently, from 1981 to 1982, Baillargeon completed a postdoctoral fellowship at MIT under the supervision of Susan Carey. She received her first academic appointment at the University of Texas at Austin in 1982, a year later she moved to the University of Illinois where she has remained since.

Research

Causal reasoning domains
Baillargeon spends much of her career researching infant development through the lens of domains. Domains are unique frameworks that allow infants to reason and learn about events. Baillargeon identifies four causal reasoning domains entitled physical reasoning, psychological reasoning, sociomoral reasoning, and biological reasoning. Each of the four domains focus on a specific expectation that infants have when witnessing a phenomenon.

Improving understanding of infant cognition
Baillargeon's research on causal reasoning in infants furthered understanding concerning Piaget's theory of cognitive development. Piaget's experiments on the development of a concept of object permanence in infants required the children to manually search for the hidden object by pulling a cover off to reveal the object. Baillargeon argues that Piaget's finding regarding infants' failure to understand object permanence until 8–12 months old was rooted in a lack of motor ability as opposed to inadequate cognitive development. In an effort to account for infants' lack of motor skills, Baillargeon's studies of object permanence measure infants' fixation times on (i.e., how long they spend looking at) impossible versus possible events. Infants spent longer times looking at events that defied physical laws applied to obscured objects, implying that infants do, indeed, understand object permanence.

A study by Baillargeon and colleague Julie DeVos confirmed the concept of object permanence in infants as young as 3.5 months old. Through the use of an eye tracker, Baillargeon and DeVos concluded that the longer length of time spent looking at the taller carrot showed that 3.5-month-old infants knew the existence, height, and direction of the carrot, and they had an expectation to see the tall carrot appear over the short screen. Baillargeon uses the term "violation of expectation paradigm" to account for the surprise which infants show by gazing longer at an impossible event.

Baillargeon expresses contrasting ideas to those of her mentor Elizabeth Spelke. Although both Baillargeon and Spelke believe that children are born with some understanding of the world, Baillargeon claims that this understanding comes in the form of innate learning mechanisms while Spelke argues that infants are born with substantive knowledge regarding objects. Baillargeon claims that infants learn to reason about novel physical phenomena by forming an all or nothing concept, adding discrete and continuous variables that seem to affect the event, and lastly they reason qualitatively and quantitatively.

Criticisms
Baillargeon's research on object permanence met criticism from Gregor Schoner and Esther Thelen. Schoner and Thelen argued that Baillargeon was overly extrapolating the results of her studies on infants' knowledge regarding object permanence. They believe that the violation of expectation paradigm merely signifies that infants notice a difference between the stimuli, such as more movement or different colors, as opposed to showing surprise at the sight of a seemingly impossible event. Despite these criticisms, Baillargeon's work continues to be influential in developmental psychology.

Major works

Awards
1989: Boyd R. McCandless Young Scientist Award from the American Psychological Association.
1991: Guggenheim Fellow.
2007: Elected a Fellow of the American Academy of Arts and Sciences.
2013: Fyssen Foundation International Prize for contributing vast knowledge on the theme "Human Cognitive Development."
2015: Elected to the National Academy of Sciences.

References

External links
Faculty Biography, Department of Psychology, University of Illinois
Infant Cognition Lab

Living people
1954 births
American women psychologists
American developmental psychologists
Canadian women psychologists
Canadian psychologists
Canadian expatriate academics in the United States
Developmental psychologists
Fellows of the American Academy of Arts and Sciences
McGill University alumni
University of Pennsylvania School of Arts and Sciences alumni
University of Texas at Austin faculty
University of Illinois Urbana-Champaign faculty
Cognitive development researchers
Fellows of the Cognitive Science Society
Foreign associates of the National Academy of Sciences
American women academics
21st-century American women
American cognitive scientists